La Correspondencia is a defunct Spanish-language newspaper published in Puerto Rico and founded by Ramón B. López in San Juan on December 18, 1890. La Correspondencia de Puerto Rico became the largest circulating daily newspaper in Puerto Rico with a print run of 5,000 copies a day.

See also

 List of newspapers in Puerto Rico

References

External links
 Historic digitized issues of La Correspondencia in the Florida and Puerto Rico Newspaper Project, part of the Library of Congress's Chronicling America program.

Spanish-language newspapers published in Puerto Rico
Defunct newspapers published in Puerto Rico
Mass media in San Juan, Puerto Rico